RED Mountain Resort is a ski resort in western Canada, located on Granite, Grey, Kirkup, and Red Mountains in Rossland, a former gold mining town in the West Kootenay region of southeastern British Columbia. RED Mountain is one of the oldest ski hills in North America, with a history dating back to the creation of the Red Mountain Ski Club (RMSC) in the first decade of the 1900s. RED Mountain is located in the Monashee Mountains just north of the U.S. border.

RED Mountain Resort is known for having a variety of challenging expert terrain and for being geared towards intermediate and expert level skiers and riders.

Its three main summits, Red Mountain, Granite Mountain, and Grey Mountain are serviced by six chairlifts, a T-bar, and a magic carpet and its fourth summit, Mt Kirkup, is in-bounds cat ski accessible (for just $10/run), all adding up to access  of skiable terrain on 119 marked runs.

Access
RED Mountain is served by resort-owned shuttles from small airports in Trail and Castlegar.  Shuttles also operate to the nearest international airports in Spokane, WA (2.5 hrs.) and Kelowna (3.5 hrs.).

History
In the summer of 1958, a new slalom slope was cleared by the RMSC for racing practice. Work was delayed until the fall due to threats of forest fires. At the time, Red Mountain had just one chairlift, the Red Chair, western Canada's first in 1947. During the 1958-59 season, daily lift tickets were $3.50 for the general public and $2.25 for RMSC members (or 40 cents for a single ride).

Michel Trudeau, third son of Canadian Prime Minister Pierre Elliott Trudeau and Margaret Trudeau-Kemper and younger brother of Canadian Prime Minister Justin Trudeau, had been working for about a year at Red Mountain Resort and living in Rossland when on November 13, 1998, during a backcountry skiing trip with some friends in Kokanee Glacier Provincial Park, he was swept into Kokanee Lake by an avalanche and unable to reach the shore and drowned at age 23.

In the summer of 2013, a third peak was added, Grey Mountain, adding  of terrain and 22 named runs.

See also
 Red Mountain (disambiguation)

References

External links
 Red Mountain Ski Resort
 Red Mountain Ski Area Information on Snowguide.org
 Tourism Rossland

Ski areas and resorts in British Columbia
Monashee Mountains
West Kootenay